Colin Prockter (born 4 June 1946) is an actor and TV writer who has appeared on many TV series and films since the 1960s. Prockter is probably best known for his role as Eddie Maddocks in Coronation Street (2005).

Filmography
{| class="wikitable" style="font-size: 90%;"
! colspan="4" style="background: LightSteelBlue;" | Television
|-
! Year !! Title !! Role !! Notes
|-
| 1969 || Z-Cars || Arthur Leach || Episodes: Not That Sort of Policeman
|-
| 1970 || The Borderers || Hob || Episode: Hostage
|-
| 1970 || A Family at War || Private Galt || Episode: For Strategic Reasons
|-
| 1975 || The Sweeney || Stupid Hawes || Episode: Ringer
|-
| 1975 || Ransom || Mike ||
|-
| 1976 || Play for Today || The Porter || Episode: Double Dare
|-
| 1979 || Goodbye Darling || || Unknown episodes
|-
| 1980 || Minder || Stevie || Episode: Caught in the Act, Fact
|-
| 1981 || Play for Today || The Porter || Episode: London is Drowning Double Dare
|-
| 1985 || Dempsey and Makepeace || John Bates || Episode: Judgement
|-
| 1989 || Precious Bane || Ox Driver ||
|-
| 1989 || Hannay || Reverend Harker || Episode: The Good Samaritan
|-
| 1989 || The Bill || Mr Burridge || Episode: Pathways
|-
| 1993 || Coronation Street || John Halpem || Episode: #1.3491
|-
| 1995 || Coronation Street || Rodney Bostock || Episodes: #1.3929, #1.3930
|-
| 1997 || The Famous Five || Coastguard || Episode: Five on Kirrin Island Again
|-
| 1999 || Kavanagh QC || Prison Officer || Episode: The More Loving One
|-
| 2001 || The Whistle-Blower || Pater Carey ||
|-
| 2001 || The Infinite Worlds of H.G. Wells || Mr. Perkins, Foreman || TV miniseries
|-
| 2001 || Doctors || Major Stanley Miller || Episode: Military Manoeuvers
|-
| 2002 || Trial and Retribution || Major Giddings || Episode: Trial and Retribution
|-
| 2002 || My Family || Raymond || Episode: Imperfect Strangers
|-
| 2002 || The Bill || Mr Yardley || Episode: #063
|-
| 2003 || Heartbeat || Mr Arkwright || Episode: Out of the Blue
|-
| 2003 || Casualty || Williams || Episode: Flight
|-
| 2004 || My Family || Raymond || Episode: Imperfect strangers
|-
| 2005 || Doctor Who || Head chef || Episode: The Long Game
|-
| 2005 || Afterlife || Arthur Rose || Episode: More Than Meets the Eye
|-
| 2005 || The Bill || Landlord || Episode: #344
|-
| 2005 || Hex || George the Porter || Episode: Death Takes the Mother
|-
| 2005 || Coronation Street || Eddie Maddocks || Episodes: #1.6058, #1.6061, #1.6083, #1.6084
|-
| 2006 || Doctors || David Allen || Episode: Out of the Past
|-
| 2008 || Coronation Street || Clarky || Episode: #1.6855
|-
| 2008 || Doctors || Martin Jones || Episode: Anger Management
|-
| 2010 || Doctor Who || Air Raid Warden || Episode:''' Victory of the Daleks|-
|-
! colspan="4" style="background: LightSteelBlue;" | Film
|-
! Year !! Film !! Role !! Notes
|-
| 1995 || Feast of July || Man in Pub ||
|}

Other works
Prockter was also one of the co-writers of the 1983 TV series Luna'' alongside Colin Bennett.

References

Living people
British male television actors
1946 births
Place of birth missing (living people)
Actors from Gloucestershire